George Hardy may refer to:

 George Hardy (actor) (born 1954), American dentist and star of cult film Troll 2
 George Hardy (labor leader) (1911–1990), Canadian-American labor leader
 George Hardy (artist) (1822–1909), British genre painter
 George Hardy (Liberal politician) (1851–1920), British Member of Parliament for Stowmarket 1906–1910
 George Francis Hardy (1855–1914), British actuary and amateur astronomer
 George Hardy (communist) (1884–1966), English communist
 George Hardy (Tuskegee Airman) (born 1925) African-American Tuskegee Airmen.
 W. G. Hardy (1895–1979), Canadian professor, writer, and ice hockey administrator

See also 
 George Hardie (disambiguation)